Port Arthur is a locality in the Australian state of South Australia located on the Yorke Peninsula at the northern end of Gulf St Vincent about  north west of the state capital of Adelaide and about  north of the town of Port Wakefield.

Its boundaries were created in May 1999 for the "long established name." Port Arthur was used from 1861 to 1863 as a minor port for an enterprise moving passengers between Port Adelaide and the towns of Moonta and Wallaroo using the steam tug, Eleanor, and coach services operated by both "Mr Opie's Horse Conveyances" and W. Rounsevell.

Port Arthur is located within the federal Division of Grey, the state electoral district of Narungga and the local government area of the Yorke Peninsula Council.

See also
List of cities and towns in South Australia
Clinton Conservation Park

Notes and references
Notes

Citations

Towns in South Australia
Gulf St Vincent
Yorke Peninsula